Kendriya Vidyalaya Maligaon is a higher secondary school located at the Maligaon area in Guwahati, Assam, India. It was established in 1979 and is affiliated with the Central Board of Secondary Education (CBSE). The school provides education to the children of Central Government employees, especially railway employees,armed forces and paramilitary personnel. The school is run by KVS an autonomous body formed under the Ministry of Human Resource Development, Government of India and is affiliated to the Central Board of Secondary Education, New Delhi.

Kendriya Vidyalaya NFR Maligaon is a project school under the North East Frontier Railway and is close to the Kamakhya Railway Station.  Its Secondary section building is constructed on seven acres. It has Computer Labs, a Physics lab, Chemistry Lab, Biology Lab, Geography Lab, Mathematics Lab, Biotechnology-cum-Junior Science Lab, Music Room, Art Education room, Work Education room and a Library. It has a separate Primary Building, sports complex, auditorium, and an assembly hall. It has a separate park for the Primary section students.

Aims
The school aims to cater to the educational needs of children of Central Government employees including Defence and Para-military personnel by providing a common programme of education, and to promote innovations in education in collaboration with other bodies like the Central Board of Secondary Education (CBSE) and the National Council of Education Research and Training (NCERT).

The school was started in 1980 after a petition was filed by Northeast Frontier Railway employees with the Indian Railway authorities and Kendriya Vidyalaya at Delhi. The petition was filed to start a KV in the Maligaon area for the children of railway employees working at the railway headquarters at Maligaon. The Affiliation code for the school is 200016. As of December 2018, Mr. Raju Kumar Das is the principal.

See also
 List of Kendriya Vidyalayas

References 

Schools in Guwahati
Kendriya Vidyalayas
1979 establishments in Assam
Educational institutions established in 1979